The list of shipwrecks in 1953 includes ships sunk, foundered, grounded, or otherwise lost during 1953.

January

1 January

6 January

8 January

9 January

11 January

15 January

17 January

18 January

21 January

23 January

25 January

30 January

31 January

February

1 February

3 February

15 February

26 February

March

1 March

2 March

3 March

4 March

8 March

10 March

11 March

17 March

20 March

28 March

29 March

April

1 April

2 April

4 April

6 April

7 April

10 April

13 April

14 April

18 April

28 April

May

6 May

9 May

11 May

17 May

19 May

20 May

24 May

26 May

June

4 June

7 June

16 June

11 May

26 June

July

2 July

7 July

14 July

16 July

20 July

23 July

26 July

August

9 August

11 August

31 August

September

3 September

7 September

8 September

9 September

21 September

23 September

27 September

29 September

30 September

Unknown date

October

7 October

9 October

12 October

13 October

14 October

21 October

22 October

25 October

Unknown date

November

2 November

4 November

6 November

7 November

8 November

9 November

16 November

24 November

25 November

29 November

30 November

December

14 December

15 December

24 December

Unknown date

References

See also 

1953
 
Ships